The name Kirsten was used for two tropical cyclones in the Eastern Pacific Ocean. Additionally, the name Kristen was used once.

 Tropical Storm Kirsten (1966)
 Tropical Storm Kristen (1970)
 Hurricane Kirsten (1974)

Pacific hurricane set index articles